María de Valdés Álvarez (born 19 October 1998) is a Spanish swimmer. She competed in the women's 1500 metre freestyle event at the 2020 European Aquatics Championships, in Budapest, Hungary.
And she takes second place for women's 5 kilometers open water swimming at 2022 European Aquatics Championships in Rome, Italy.

References

External links
 

1998 births
Living people
Spanish female freestyle swimmers
Place of birth missing (living people)